James Luther Slayden (June 1, 1853 – February 24, 1924) was an American politician, cotton merchant, and rancher. He was elected from San Antonio to United States House of Representatives, serving eleven consecutive terms.

Early life and education
James Luther Slayden was born in Mayfield, Kentucky. His parents were Letitia E. (née Beadles) and Thomas A. Slayden. After his father died in 1869, he moved with his mother and siblings to New Orleans, Louisiana. There, he attended common schools and worked for two years. From 1872 and 1873, he attended Washington and Lee University in Lexington, Virginia. There, he was a member of the Fraternity of Delta Psi (St. Anthony Hall). He returned to New Orleans in 1873, where he worked until he moved to Texas in November 1876.

Career
Slayden moved to San Antonio, Texas, in 1879 and became a rancher cotton merchant.

He became active in Democratic Party and was elected to the Texas House of Representatives in 1892. There, he served on the Finance Committee; Insurance, Statistics and History Committee; the Judicial Districts Committee; the Public Buildings and Grounds Committee; the State Affairs Committee; and the Town and City Corporations Committee. He worked to develop trade between Texas and other areas, and the construction railroads in Texas. After serving in the state legislature from January 10, to January 8, 1893, he declined renomination and returned to ranching.

In 1896, Slayden was elected to the United States Congress representing Texas' 12th district as a Democrat. He was re-elected in 1898 and 1900, serving in total from 1897 to 1903. In 1903, he was redistricted to Texas's 14th congressional district and was elected to serve from 1903 to 1919. He served a total of eleven terms in Congress.

In Congress Slayden promoted the growth of the railroad system in Texas. He served on the Committee on Military Affairs and was key in making San Antonio a military center and in enlarging Fort Sam Houston.

After losing his bid for appointment as President Woodrow Wilson's Secretary of War, Slayden declined renomination to run for Congress in 1918.

When he left Congress in 1919, Slayden kept busy with mines in Mexico, a ranch in Texas, and an orchard in Virginia.

Honors 
Phi Beta Kappa Key, Washington and Lee University
Slayden, Texas in Gonzales County was named in his honor in the late 1880s.

Personal life
In 1883, he married Ellen Maury who was from Charlottesville, Virginia. They had no children. In 1889, Ellen worked for the San Antonio Express as the society editor. After Slayden's election to Congress, they moved to Washington, D.C. in 1896.

In October 1910, Slayden became one of the first trustees of the Carnegie Endowment for International Peace. He was also president of the American Peace Society. He was active in various fraternal organizations, including the Elks, the Masons, and the Odd Fellows. In addition, he was an Episcopalian.

In 1927, he died in San Antonio at the age of 70. He was buried in Mission Park Cemetery.

References

Further information
Sondra Wyatt Gray, The Political Career of James Luther Slayden, University of Texas at Austin, 1962

1853 births
1924 deaths
People from Mayfield, Kentucky
People from New Orleans
Washington and Lee University alumni
St. Anthony Hall
People from San Antonio
American Episcopalians
19th-century American merchants
Democratic Party members of the Texas House of Representatives
Democratic Party members of the United States House of Representatives from Texas
American Freemasons
19th-century American Episcopalians
20th-century American Episcopalians